The Agronomy Faculty is one of the 10 faculties that comprise the Universidad de San Carlos de Guatemala, established on June 14, 1950, in the context of the revolutionary reform of the revolutionary governments, due to the need of specialized professionals in the agronomic are in an eminently rural country during its first steps of modernization.

Course Offerings 
The Faculty offers 5 programs of undergraduate, 8 programs of postgraduate and 5 programs of mastery, also, it is one of the faculties that has the largest number of postgraduate teachers.

Its headquarters is located in the University City, in the Guatemala City, however, it has a big presence in the most Universitarian Regional Centres from the university.

Universidad de San Carlos de Guatemala